Brian Downey may refer to:
 Brian Downey (actor) (born 1944), Canadian actor
 Brian C. Downey (1950–2012), Canadian politician
 Brian Downey (drummer) (born 1951), Irish drummer